Dona Augusta is a village on São Tomé Island in São Tomé and Príncipe. Its population is 166 (2012 census). Dona Augusta is located 4 km southwest of São João dos Angolares and 1 km northeast of Praia Pesqueira.

Population history

References

Populated places in Caué District